The Shire of Victoria Plains in Western Australia was originally established on 24 January 1871 as one of the initial road districts under the District Road Boards Act 1871, with a chairman and councillors. With the passage of the Local Government Act 1960, all road districts became Shires with a shire president and councillors effective 1 July 1961.

Chairmen

Presidents

References

Lists of local government leaders in Western Australia
Shire of Victoria Plains